The Catalina is an American reality television series on The CW. The series debuted on May 29, 2012.

Episodes

Reception
Brian Lowry of Variety called the series "a Jersey Shore wannabe," adding "The Catalina feels like a fairly sedate knockoff of numerous concepts."

On June 14, 2012 The CW announced that it would replace encores of The Catalina with repeats of 90210.

References

External links

2010s American reality television series
2012 American television series debuts
2012 American television series endings
English-language television shows
The CW original programming
Television shows set in Miami